Moxie Software is a software platform company, originally under the name nGenera Corporation. The company changed its name from nGenera to Moxie Software in 2010. In January 2014, Moxie Software named Rebecca Ward its new president and CEO. In August 2021, Moxie was acquired by NICE Ltd.

References

Software companies based in California
Companies based in Sunnyvale, California
Defunct software companies of the United States